Nikolay Vasilev Ivanov (born ) is a retired Bulgarian male volleyball player.

Ivanov was a member of the Bulgarian team that came seventh at the 1996 Summer Olympics. He was the setter and the captain of the Bulgaria men's national volleyball team at the 2002 FIVB Volleyball Men's World Championship in Japan. He played for Arcelik.

Clubs
 Arcelik (2002)

References

1972 births
Living people
Bulgarian men's volleyball players
Place of birth missing (living people)
Volleyball players at the 1996 Summer Olympics
Olympic volleyball players of Bulgaria
Ural Ufa volleyball players